The Cutzamala River is a river of Mexico. It originates in the Trans-Mexican Volcanic Belt of Central Mexico in the state of Michoacán. Dams on the upper portion of river provide water to Mexico City, via an aqueduct over the mountains known as the Cutzamala System.

The lower Cutzamala forms part of the border between Michoacán and Guerrero states. It empties into the Balsas River near Ciudad Altamirano, Guerrero.

See also
List of rivers of Mexico

References
Atlas of Mexico, 1975 (http://www.lib.utexas.edu/maps/atlas_mexico/river_basins.jpg).
The Prentice Hall American World Atlas, 1984.
Rand McNally, The New International Atlas, 1993.

Balsas River
Rivers of Guerrero
Rivers of Michoacán